The Wiener–Ikehara theorem is a Tauberian theorem introduced by . It follows from Wiener's Tauberian theorem, and can be used to prove the prime number theorem (Chandrasekharan, 1969).

Statement 
Let A(x) be a non-negative, monotonic nondecreasing function of x, defined for 0 ≤ x < ∞. Suppose that

converges for ℜ(s) > 1 to the function ƒ(s) and that, for some non-negative number c,

has an extension as a continuous function for ℜ(s) ≥ 1.
Then the limit as x goes to infinity of e−x A(x) is equal to c.

One Particular Application 

An important number-theoretic application of the theorem is to Dirichlet series of the form

where a(n) is non-negative.  If the series converges to an analytic function in

with a simple pole of residue c at s = b, then

Applying this to the logarithmic derivative of the Riemann zeta function, where the coefficients in the Dirichlet series are values of the von Mangoldt function, it is possible to deduce the Prime number theorem from the fact that the zeta function has no zeroes on the line

References

 

Theorems in number theory
Tauberian theorems